David Glascott (born 27 April 1961) is a former Australian rules footballer who played for Carlton in the VFL during the 1980s. Glascott usually played as a wingman and started his league career as a premiership player in 1981 and 1982. Later on in his career he was used in both attack and defence as well as being a rover. He was wiry for his height, but he lacked nothing in courage or speed and was always getting the ball for the champion Blues teams of the 1980s. Glascott’s career suffered greatly when he suffered a season-ending shoulder dislocation early in 1989: when he did come back in 1990 and 1991, Glascott took over the role of Reserves captain and played in a premiership team to complement his 1979 Under-19 and three senior flag sides. In 1993, he played for VFA club Frankston.

After he retired as a player, Glascott took on the role of coach of cellar-dwelling WAFL club  for the 1994 season, and even considered playing again during the off-season. However, Glascott could win only ten of forty-two games in his two seasons in charge and was not reappointed.

In 2001 he was named in the Carlton Hall of Fame.

References

External links

1961 births
Living people
Australian rules footballers from Victoria (Australia)
Carlton Football Club players
Carlton Football Club Premiership players
Perth Football Club coaches
Frankston Football Club players
Three-time VFL/AFL Premiership players